Charlotte Olympia is a British luxury shoe and accessories brand founded by Charlotte Olympia Dellal in 2008.

History 
Dellal launched her eponymous label after graduating from London College of Fashion, where she studied Cordwainers Footwear.  Her first footwear collection was presented during London Fashion Week in February 2008. In 2010, Charlotte Olympia opened its first store on Maddox Street in London, followed by a second store in 2011 on East 65th Street in New York City, and the third store on Rodeo Drive, Los Angeles in July 2013. In 2014, the brand opened three additional stores in Miami, Hong Kong, and Dubai. In 2015, Charlotte Olympia opened more stores around the globe. The first store opened in the South Coast Plaza in California. The second store opened in the Forum Shops at Caesars in Las Vegas. The third store opened in the Emporium Shopping Complex in Bangkok. Finally, the last store was opened at Brompton Cross in London.

Brand 
Charlotte Olympia's designs are influenced by classical Hollywood cinema glamour, pin-ups and movie stars from the 1940s and 50s. 

The brand has become known for the "island" platform Dolly pump, the Kitty flat and Perspex Pandora clutch box. All shoes and accessories are handcrafted in Italy.

Although primarily focused on footwear and accessories for women, the label also produces a collection for little girls called 'Incy' and the Tom Cat smoking slipper for men.  

Her logo is a spider web design placed under the shoe sole.

Awards 
2008: 
 NewGen sponsorship by the British Fashion Council.
2010: 
 Footwear News Achievement Awards, Emerging Designer of the Year
2011: 
 British Fashion Awards, Accessory Designer of the Year
2012: 
 Glamour Women of the Year, Accessory Designer of the Year 
 Footwear News Achievement Awards, Designer of the Year  
 WGSN Global Fashion Awards, Footwear and Accessories Designer Award
2014
Marie Claire Spain Prix de la Moda Awards, Accessory Designer of the Year 
2015:
Walpole Awards, British Brand Ambassador
British Fashion Awards, Accessory Designer of the Year

Designer biography 
Charlotte Olympia Dellal was born on 5 June 1981 in Cape Town, South Africa, to Brazilian model Andréa de Magalhães Vieira and British property developer Guy Dellal, son of the property tycoon Jack Dellal. Her sister is the model Alice Dellal.

Charlotte attended Bedales School, Hampshire. At the age of eighteen she left to complete a foundation course at the London College of Fashion before graduating from Cordwainers with a degree in product development. She launched her London-based shoe and accessory brand in 2008.

She lives in north Kensington, London with her husband, Maxim Crewe (m.2010) and three sons.

References

External links 
 

1981 births
Living people
High fashion brands
Luxury brands
Fashion designers from London
British women fashion designers
Shoe designers
2008 establishments in England
Companies that filed for Chapter 11 bankruptcy in 2018